"Nobody Love" is a song by American singer Tori Kelly. The track was released as the lead single from her debut studio album, Unbreakable Smile, on February 8, 2015. The song was written by Kelly, Max Martin, Rickard Göransson, and Savan Kotecha, and was produced by Martin and Göransson. It was Kelly's first entry on the US Billboard Hot 100 peaking at number 60. It was also certified Platinum in New Zealand, along with reaching mainstream success in Australia and Canada.

Background and release
"Nobody Love" was released for retail via digital distribution, on February 8, 2015. The lyric video for the song was also uploaded to YouTube and VEVO, one day after the release.

Music video
The song's accompanying music video premiered on February 26, 2015, on Tori's Vevo account on YouTube. Since its release, the video has received over 21 million views. The music video was directed by Ryan Pallotta.

Track listing
Digital download
"Nobody Love" – 3:23

Covers and use in media
Kelly Clarkson covered the song as part of her "Fan Requests" on opening night of her Piece by Piece Tour. Kelly was flattered that Clarkson covered her song and also thanked Clarkson "for the shoutout & being such a real artist".

"Nobody Love" was used in episodes of Catfish: The TV Show and Love and Hip Hop: Hollywood.

Girl Spirit contestant Bae Sungyeon from Pledis Entertainment trainee group Pledis Girlz sang a cover of this song.

Charts

Certifications

References

2015 singles
2015 songs
Capitol Records singles
Song recordings produced by Max Martin
Songs written by Max Martin
Songs written by Rickard Göransson
Songs written by Savan Kotecha
Songs written by Tori Kelly
Tori Kelly songs